Henrique Andrade Silva, generally known as Henrique (born 9 May 1985), is a Brazilian-Australian footballer who plays for Coomera Colts in the Gold Coast Premier League. On 7 October 2015, he officially became an Australian citizen, making him eligible to play for the Australian national team.

Club career
Henrique played his youth football in Brazil with América Mineiro and in 2003 joined Dutch giants Feyenoord. After failing to break into the first team, Henrique returned to Brazil where he played senior football with América and was loaned out to several other Brazilian clubs. Henrique is nicknamed the Slippery Fish.

Brisbane Roar
Henrique joined Brisbane Roar initially as a temporary injury replacement for fellow Brazilian Reinaldo in February 2009, after impressing coach Frank Farina in a week-long trial after being given permission to talk with the Australian club by América.

He made his first appearance as a second-half substitute in the Roar's second-leg 2–1 win over Central Coast Mariners in the 2009 A-League semi-finals. There was minor controversy due to the transfer being completed only four hours before his debut appearance. Henrique signed a one-year contract with the Roar on 4 March 2009, after impressing during his loan spell.

On 17 September 2009, he signed a new three-year deal with the Roar. Henrique missed up to two months of the 2010–11 season because of a broken arm, which he injured in a match against Melbourne Victory. Henrique came back as a wild card for the Roar and in the 2010–11 grand final against Central Coast Mariners, scored a goal in extra-time and the winning penalty.

On 4 May 2014, Henrique scored the winning goal against the Western Sydney Wanderers in the 2014 Hyundai A-League Grand Final at Suncorp Stadium.

On 14 November 2014, Henrique came off the bench and scored a hat-trick as Brisbane Roar registered their first win of the season with a 4–0 result over Newcastle. Henrique finished the season rather early, as he was required to undergo knee reconstruction, effectively ruling him out for the rest of 2014–15. Despite this, he finished 2014–15 as his most successful, netting eight goals in 16 games.

Henrique netted a stunning goal, his third of the season, from half-way, lengthwise equivalent to 45 metres, as Roar defeated Melbourne City 3–1.

On 16 June 2016, it was announced that Henrique would depart the Roar after seven seasons with the club.

Adelaide United
On 27 August 2016, Henrique joined Adelaide United on a one-year deal. On 4 December 2016, Henrique scored a brace against Wellington Phoenix to win Adelaide United's first match of the 16/17 season, as the match ended 2–0.

Chiangrai United
On 31 January 2017, Henrique left Adelaide United after 13 games to join Thai club Chiangrai United

Return to Brisbane Roar
After training with Brisbane Roar and the club announcing they won't sign Henrique for the current season, on 22 February 2018, the club back-flipped on their decision and signed Henrique, including him in the match-day squad for the current round. 

In December 2018, Henrique reached 150 games with Brisbane Roar and also scored a goal during the game against Adelaide United. He left the Roar after the 2018/19 season.

Honours
Brisbane Roar
 A-League Premiership: 2010–11, 2013–14
 A-League Championship: 2010–11, 2011–12, 2013–14

References

External links
 Brisbane Roar profile

Living people
1985 births
Association football wingers
A-League Men players
Brazilian footballers
Feyenoord players
América Futebol Clube (MG) players
Guarani FC players
Uberaba Sport Club players
Brisbane Roar FC players
Negeri Sembilan FA players
Adelaide United FC players
Chiangrai United F.C. players
Expatriate soccer players in Australia
Naturalised soccer players of Australia
Brazilian emigrants to Australia
Footballers from São Paulo